Pokémon is a media franchise created by video game designer Satoshi Tajiri that centers on fictional creatures called Pokémon. , there have been 23 animated films and one live action film. The first nineteen animated films are based on the anime television series of the same name, with the original film being remade into the 22nd. The 20th, 21st and 23rd animated films are set in an alternate continuity to the anime. The films are produced by the animation studios OLM, Production I.G, Xebec, and Wit Studio, and distributed in Japan by Toho, with various studios distributing the films in North America. They were directed by Kunihiko Yuyama and Tetsuo Yajima, and written by Takeshi Shudo, Hideki Sonoda, Atsuhiro Tomioka, Shōji Yonemura, Eiji Umehara, and Aya Takaha. The first Pokémon animated film, Pokémon: The First Movie, was released in Japan in 1998, which was remade into Mewtwo Strikes Back: Evolution. A live-action film, Pokémon Detective Pikachu, was produced by American studio Legendary Entertainment, directed by Rob Letterman, and written by Letterman and Nicole Perlman. It is distributed in Japan by Toho, and outside of Japan and China by Warner Bros. It was released on May 10, 2019.

The films star the Pokémon trainer Ash Ketchum and his electric mouse partner Pikachu. Detective Pikachu film is based on the 2016 video game Detective Pikachu and stars Ryan Reynolds as the motion capture role of Detective Pikachu, with Justice Smith and Kathryn Newton as the lead human roles.

There are also two animated television specials that were broadcast on TV Tokyo featuring Ash and Ash's Pikachu and ten short animated films. Warner Bros. licensed the first three animated films in North America, and Miramax Films licensed the following four films (with Studio Distribution Services, LLC, a joint venture between Warner Bros. Home Entertainment and Universal Pictures Home Entertainment, handled North America home video distribution of the first three animated films (including  under the both Kids' WB and Viz Media labels), and Paramount Home Entertainment (via Miramax) handled the U.S. home video distribution of the following four films). In Canadian releases, they were licensed by Alliance Atlantis (now known as Entertainment One, a subsidiary of Hasbro), which was responsible for Canadian distribution of Miramax Films (with Studio Distribution Services, LLC, a joint venture between Warner Bros. Home Entertainment and Universal Pictures Home Entertainment, handled Canadian home video distribution of Miramax Films (including the following four films)). In these four movies distributed by Miramax, there were partly or completely different dubbing casts than in the TV series in many countries. Starting with Pokémon: Lucario and the Mystery of Mew, Viz Media is the only North American licensee (with Studio Distribution Services, LLC, a joint venture between Warner Bros. Home Entertainment and Universal Pictures Home Entertainment, handled North America home video distribution of Pokémon: Lucario and the Mystery of Mew onwards).

The 23rd and most recent animated film, Pokémon the Movie: Secrets of the Jungle, was originally set for release in Japanese theaters on July 10, 2020, but delayed to December 25, 2020, due to the COVID-19 pandemic; it was released on October 8, 2021, in the United States.

Feature films

Live-action films 
The launch of the mobile game Pokémon Go in 2016 reignited mainstream interest back into the Pokémon franchise in the Western market since its initial peak in the early 2000s; various Hollywood film companies approached The Pokémon Company to gain film rights. Eventually, Warner Bros. Pictures and Legendary Entertainment struck a deal to produce a live-action adaptation of the 2016 video game Detective Pikachu called Pokémon Detective Pikachu, the first official live-action Pokémon film. In January 2019, ahead of film's release, Legendary has begun development on a sequel to Pokémon Detective Pikachu.

Home video releases

Region 2 (Japan)

Box office performance

Critical reception

Notes

References

External links 
 
 
 

Pokémon (film series)
Pokémon (film series)
Japanese fantasy adventure films
films
Pokemon
Pokemon